The women's 52 kg competition in judo at the 1992 Summer Olympics in Barcelona was held on 1 August at the Palau Blaugrana. The gold medal was won by Almudena Muñoz of Spain.

Results

Main brackets

Pool A

Pool B

Repechages

Repechage A

Repechage B

Final

Final classification

References

External links
 

W52
Judo at the Summer Olympics Women's Half Lightweight
Olympics W52
Judo